Tiaan van der Merwe (born ) is a South African rugby union player for the Lokomotiv Penza in the Russian Rugby Championship. His regular position is hooker.

References

South African rugby union players
Living people
1998 births
Rugby union players from Johannesburg
Rugby union hookers
Golden Lions players
South Africa Under-20 international rugby union players
Griquas (rugby union) players
Leopards (rugby union) players
Lokomotiv Penza players
Rugby union flankers